The Trebizond Campaign, also known as the Battle of Trebizond, was a series of successful Russian naval and land operations that resulted in the capture of Trabzon. It was the logistical step after the Erzerum Campaign. Operations began on February 5 and concluded when the Ottoman troops abandoned Trabzon on the night of April 15, 1916.

Lazistan Offensive

Timeline 

 1916 –
 2nd half of January; Russians occupied the territory between the coruh and the Russian frontier. Makriali was taken.
 January 17–20; Russian destroyers crushed a large number of Turkish sailing crafts along Lazistan coast that were supplying Turkish army.
 February; Turkistanski Regiments occupied Hopa.
 February 5; Russian squadron heavily damaged Turkish trenches beyond the Arhavi river.
 February 6: Turks abandoned their lines, leaving 500 dead behind.
 February 15–16: The same sequence of events was repeated at Vitze. Turks retrenched behind the Buyuk-dere river. Several Turkish battalions reinforced Rize from Trebizond. General Lyakhov in conference with naval officers accepted proposal to land infantry (2 battalions with 2 mountain guns) in the rear of the Turkish position.
 March 4–5; Rostislav and the gunboats Kubanetz and Donetz supported the amphibious landing at Atina. Turks on the Buyuk-dere position fled into the mountains.
 March 6–7; The landing operation was repeated at Mapavri and met with only slight resistance.
 March 8; Russians occupied Rize and pushed their patrols forward to the River Kalopotamos to the east of the small town of Of. Here the advance of the Black Sea coast detachment was temporarily halted.

Effect on Armenians 
Prior to World War I, the vibrant Armenian community of Trabzon numbered 30,000. In 1915, during the Armenian genocide, they were massacred and deported. After the Russian capture of Trabzon, some 500 surviving Armenians were able to return, as well as Armenian monks of the Kaymakli Monastery.

.

References 

Conflicts in 1916
Battles of the Caucasus Campaign
Battles of World War I involving the Ottoman Empire
Battles of World War I involving Russia
History of Trabzon
Trebizond vilayet
1916 in the Ottoman Empire
1916 in the Russian Empire
February 1916 events
March 1916 events
April 1916 events